Absence is the debut full-length studio album by Paper Route, released on April 28, 2009.

Track listing

Charts

References

2009 debut albums
Paper Route (band) albums
Universal Motown Records albums